Seol Jung-hwan (born November 5, 1985) is a South Korean actor and model.

Filmography

Television series

Awards and nominations

References

External links 
 Seol Jung-hwan at Hunus Entertainment 
 

1985 births
Living people
South Korean male models
South Korean male television actors